Arges was one of the three Hesiodic Cyclopes in Greek mythology.  He was elsewhere called Acmonides or Pyracmon. His name means "bright" and represents the brightness from lightning.

Birth and forging of the lightning bolt 
Arges is a child of Gaia and Uranus, and his siblings include his fellow cyclopes, Brontes and Steropes, along with the Titans and the Hundred Handed Ones. After his birth, Uranus is said to have locked Arges and his cyclopes brothers in Tartarus out of fear, along with the Hundred Handed Ones. During the war between the Titans and the Gods, Arges, Brontes, and Steropes were freed to fashion lightning bolts for Zeus during his attempt to overthrow the gods. According to Apollodorus, Arges and his fellow cyclopes also fashioned the Helmet of Invisibility for Hades, and the trident for Poseidon. These weapons played a key role in the downfall of the Titans.

Possible death 
In Hesiod's Catalogue of Women, the three Cyclopes, including Arges, are said to have been killed by Apollo in retaliation for his son Asclepius being killed by a lightning bolt. However, this contradicts Hesiod's Theogony, which implies the cyclopes are immortal. The mythographer Pherecydes of Athens fixes this discrepancy by stating that the cyclopes' sons were killed by Apollo, rather than the cyclopes themselves. Another source suggests that Zeus killed the cyclopes to prevent them from making lightning bolts for anyone other than himself.

Notes

References 

 Fowler, Robert L., Early Greek Mythography. Volume 2: Commentary. Oxford University Press. Great Clarendon Street, Oxford, OX2 6DP, United Kingdom. 2013. 
 Hard, Robin, The Routledge Handbook of Greek Mythology: Based on H.J. Rose's "Handbook of Greek Mythology", Psychology Press, 2004, . Google Books.
 Hesiod, Theogony from The Homeric Hymns and Homerica with an English Translation by Hugh G. Evelyn-White, Cambridge, MA.,Harvard University Press; London, William Heinemann Ltd. 1914. Online version at the Perseus Digital Library. Greek text available from the same website.
 Publius Ovidius Naso, Fasti translated by James G. Frazer. Online version at the Topos Text Project.
 Publius Ovidius Naso, Fasti. Sir James George Frazer. London; Cambridge, MA. William Heinemann Ltd.; Harvard University Press. 1933. Latin text available at the Perseus Digital Library.
 Publius Vergilius Maro, Aeneid. Theodore C. Williams. trans. Boston. Houghton Mifflin Co. 1910. Online version at the Perseus Digital Library.
 Publius Vergilius Maro, Bucolics, Aeneid, and Georgics. J. B. Greenough. Boston. Ginn & Co. 1900. Latin text available at the Perseus Digital Library.

Cyclopes